WCPO-TV (channel 9) is a television station in Cincinnati, Ohio, United States, affiliated with ABC. It is the flagship television property of locally based E. W. Scripps Company, which has owned the station since its inception. WCPO-TV's studios are located in the Mount Adams neighborhood of Cincinnati next to the Elsinore Arch, and its transmitter is located in the Mount Auburn section of the city.

History

Early history

The station first signed on the air at noon ET on July 26, 1949, and the first face seen was Big Jim Stacey. Originally operating on VHF channel 7, it was Cincinnati's third television station. The call letters came from The Cincinnati Post, who also owned WCPO radio (1230 AM, now WDBZ and 105.1 FM, now WUBE). The station was then owned by Scripps-Howard Newspapers.  It was the third television station to be founded by the E. W. Scripps Company, as sister station WEWS-TV in Cleveland signed on over a year-and-a-half before, and WMC-TV in Memphis signed on the year before, although Scripps would divest that station to Ellis Communications in 1993.

The station was originally a primary ABC affiliate and a secondary DuMont Television Network affiliate. With DuMont's demise in 1956, WCPO was left with just ABC until it swapped affiliations with WKRC-TV (channel 12) in 1961, becoming a CBS affiliate. This deal came because WKRC-TV's owner, Taft Broadcasting, had developed very good relations with ABC. Following the release of the FCC's Sixth Report and Order in 1952, all of Cincinnati's VHF stations changed channel positions. WCPO was reassigned to channel 9, as the previous channel 7 allocation was shifted north to Dayton and later given to WHIO-TV.

1980 hostage situation
On the early morning of October 15, 1980, WCPO and most of its news staff became part of a major news story when James Hoskins, armed with a 9mm J&R M68 semi-automatic rifle and five revolvers, seized control of WCPO's newsroom. Hoskins held reporter Elaine Green and her cameraman at gunpoint in the parking lot of WCPO's studios. He then forced his way into the newsroom and took seven more hostages.

A self-described terrorist, Hoskins stated in a videotaped interview with Green that he had, among other things, murdered his girlfriend before arriving at the studios. After voicing his displeasure with local government, Hoskins ended by saying that he would let his hostages go, but only after they helped him to barricade himself in their newsroom in anticipation of a shootout with police. Green and the others pleaded with Hoskins to get help, but to no avail. WCPO's news staff ran special newscasts from the parking lot throughout that morning. Hoskins eventually let all the hostages go, and the standoff ended later that morning when Hoskins shot himself dead while on the phone with SWAT negotiators. Green was awarded a Peabody Award for her handling of the crisis. She later married anchor and then-news director Al Schottelkotte. The two remained married until his death in 1996.

Return to ABC

For three decades, WCPO had been one of CBS' strongest affiliates. The Cincinnati market was initially unaffected by the 1994–96 affiliation switches, as the station was in the middle of a long-term affiliation contract with CBS; however, in September 1995, Scripps and ABC announced a 10-year affiliation deal for WCPO. A year earlier, Scripps had agreed to switch three of its other stations (WMAR-TV in Baltimore, KNXV-TV in Phoenix, and WFTS-TV in Tampa) to ABC as a condition of keeping its affiliation on Scripps' two largest stations, WXYZ-TV in Detroit and WEWS-TV in Cleveland. Both of those stations had been heavily wooed by CBS, which was about to lose longtime affiliates WJBK in Detroit and WJW in Cleveland to Fox as part of an affiliation deal with New World Communications.

Scripps had to maintain the CBS affiliation on WCPO until WKRC's affiliation contract with ABC expired the following year; in the meantime, in October 1995, WCPO introduced new "9 Stands for News" station branding that shrunk the CBS logo and revamped its news graphics and theme music, improving ratings. On June 3, 1996, WKRC's contract ended and the two stations reversed the 1961 affiliation swap, with WCPO rejoining ABC and WKRC reuniting with CBS. The last CBS program to air on channel 9 was the 50th Annual Tony Awards at 9 p.m. EDT, while the first ABC program to air was Good Morning America. WCPO set up a toll-free hotline to answer calls from confused viewers. The station debuted new on-air graphics designed by a Los Angeles firm.

On May 15, 2004, WCPO moved its studio facilities from 500 Central Avenue (now the site of an expanded Duke Energy Convention Center) to a new state-of-the-art building on Gilbert Avenue, in the Mount Adams neighborhood of Cincinnati.

Scripps' Cincinnati combination of WCPO and The Cincinnati Post ended when the newspaper ceased publication at the end of 2007. (Its Kentucky edition became an online-only publication simultaneously with the closure of the Post.) WCPO is the only major Cincinnati television station that has been under the same ownership since its inception, as well as the only major station in the market to remain owned by a locally based company.

News operation
WCPO-TV presently broadcasts 43 hours of locally produced newscasts each week (with seven hours each weekday and four hours each on Saturdays and Sundays). In recent years, WCPO and WKRC have been battling each other for first place in local news viewership, while NBC affiliate WLWT has been lagging behind in third or fourth place. Typically, WCPO leads the evening news race, while WKRC-TV leads in mornings and late evenings. Even after the affiliation switch in 1996 involving two of the strongest affiliates of their respective networks at the time, both stations have remained among the strongest affiliates of their current respective networks.

WCPO lacked a dedicated news department until 1959. Al Schottelkotte, a longtime columnist for The Cincinnati Enquirer (which was then owned by Scripps along with the Post), joined the station as its first news director and anchorman—a post he held until 1986.  Within a year, WCPO was the undisputed local news leader in the Cincinnati market, and remained the top-rated station for over 20 years. Partly because of his influence, the CBS Evening News was not cleared by WCPO for most of Walter Cronkite's tenure; Schottelkotte criticized the program for mostly focusing on world events and believed it "hardly covered anything west of Washington", adding: 

Consumer reporter John Matarese's reports have been syndicated to nine other stations, five of which are Scripps-owned, since 2003. However, as of October 12, 2010, Matarese's consumer reports have been aired on eleven other stations, the majority of which are Scripps owned.

WCPO began broadcasting its local newscasts in high-definition on August 19, 2007, beginning with the 6 p.m. newscast. Improvements around the station included upgraded weather graphics that match WCPO's upgraded graphics, new panel displays on set (to replace rear-projection CRT monitors on set and old plasma displays with obvious burn-in) and Scripps purchasing JVC HDPro equipment for WCPO. In the summer of 2009, WCPO upgraded its field cameras to provide high definition video.

In December 2009, WCPO reached an agreement with local Fox affiliate WXIX-TV (channel 19) to pool videographers at press conferences.

On October 1, 2012, WCPO-TV debuted the new Scripps-mandated standardized graphics and music package ("Inergy" by Stephen Arnold).

On February 3, 2020, WCPO debuted a new logo and an updated Scripps-mandated graphics and music package, while at the same time dropping the "9 On Your Side" moniker in favor of simply "WCPO 9 News."

9 First Warning Weather
Cincinnati's television stations have used their weather coverage as a selling point, especially since the Montgomery/Blue Ash tornado of 1999. WCPO brands its radars as "9 First Warning Doppler", "VIPIR 9" and "TrueView". The station runs its own radar located in Batavia, which has an average refresh time of ten seconds.

On July 1, 2003, WCPO began to operate a second Doppler weather radar out of the Clermont County Airport in Batavia. In combination with the radar located at WCPO's transmission tower site, both radars were named "Ultimate Doppler Radar", though the transmitter dome was eventually put out of service. Attenuation at the site leaves a radius around the radar blank.

In July 2007, WCPO launched a radar system with satellite imagery to allow fine street-level detail of weather events to specific locations. The TrueView system allows for local and nationwide radar sweeps. National Weather Service NEXRAD radars in Wilmington, Ohio (which covers Cincinnati, Dayton and Columbus from a central point, as is done in several areas of the country with multiple major cities), Indianapolis and Louisville are used to provide full-market coverage of severe weather events. The VIPIR 9 technology also utilizes the NEXRAD radars and 9 First Warning Doppler to create its 3D images.

I-Team
WCPO's investigative unit, the I-Team, was created in 1988, following the station's Peabody Award-winning investigation of Donald Harvey. The I-Team has won dozens of national awards, including the 1992 Sigma Delta Chi Award and 1993 Alfred I. duPont–Columbia University Award for stories about fraudulent business practices. In 1999, WCPO won the Peabody, duPont, and Sigma Delta Chi awards for investigations into the construction of Paul Brown Stadium. The station won another Peabody in 2001 for a one-hour documentary, Visions of Vine Street, that aired in the wake of the 2001 riots.

News helicopters
In 1967, WCPO introduced the Newsbird, the first news-gathering helicopter in Cincinnati and one of the first in the industry to feature live transmissions. On January 17, 1983, the Bell 206B ran out of fuel and crashed outside the station.

From 1996 to September 2000, WCPO leased a Bell 206L-3 LongRanger III helicopter out of Lunken Field. Outfitted with several cameras, Chopper 9 was used for traffic reports, updates on construction of Paul Brown Stadium and Fort Washington Way, and Friday night football specials. The helicopter proved especially useful for covering the aftermath of the 1999 Blue Ash tornado. WCPO allowed the lease to expire in 2000, citing its high cost.

On February 7, 2014, WCPO debuted another Chopper 9, this time a Bell 206B-3 JetRanger, for daily traffic and news coverage.

In 2016, WCPO debuted Sky 9, a quadcopter drone featuring a 4K-resolution camera. WCPO allowed Chopper 9's lease to expire in February 2020 in favor of Sky 9 drone footage.

Notable alumni
 Andrea Canning – evening anchor (former ABC News correspondent, now an NBC News reporter)
 Gretchen Carlson – reporter (later an anchor of Fox News Channel's Fox and Friends)
 Nick Clooney – host of The Nick Clooney Show (later an anchor at WKRC-TV)
 Pete Delkus – chief meteorologist (1996–2005; now chief meteorologist at WFAA in Dallas)
 Paula Faris – sports anchor (now correspondent for ABC News; former weekend anchor of Good Morning America; former co-host of The View)
 Brett Haber – weekend sports anchor (formerly sports director at WUSA in Washington, D.C.; formerly anchor of SportsCenter on ESPN)
 Bill Hemmer (now anchor for Fox News Channel)
 Bob Holtzman – news reporter (now correspondent for ESPN)
 "Uncle Al" Lewis – first art director for WCPO, and host of The Uncle Al Show for 35 years (died in 2009)
 Len Mink – singer/host of The Len Mink Show (now an evangelist/worship leader for meetings held by televangelist Kenneth Copeland)
 Al Schottelkotte – WCPO's first news anchor and news director (1953–94, died in 1996)

Technical information

Subchannels
The station's digital signal is multiplexed:

Subchannel 9.2 previously carried the same 24-hour local weather programming as the Weather Tracker channel on many local cable systems. Subchannel 9.3 previously carried the Live Well Network (2009–2015) until national distribution was discontinued.

Subchannel 9.4 was added on May 8, 2019, and Escape, previously subchannel 9.2, was moved to 9.4 with the addition of the revived Court TV taking its place on subchannel 9.2. WCPO's Court TV also became Charter Spectrum's channel 995 and Cincinnati Bell Fioptics channel 8. On September 30, 2019, Escape re-branded itself to Ion Mystery.

Analog-to-digital conversion
WCPO-TV discontinued regular programming on its analog signal, over VHF channel 9, on June 12, 2009, as part of the federally mandated transition from analog to digital television. The station's digital signal remained on its pre-transition VHF channel 10, using PSIP to display WCPO-TV's virtual channel as 9 on digital television receivers.

Since many viewers had reception issues after the digital transition, even with an increase of power just weeks after the transition, the station filed a Petition for Rulemaking to abandon VHF channel 10 and move to UHF channel 22. On October 7, 2009, the FCC issued a "Notice of Proposed Rulemaking" for WCPO-TV, which gives the public 25 days to comment on the proposed channel change. On December 10, 2009, the FCC issued a Report & Order, approving WCPO's move from VHF channel 10 to UHF channel 22. On January 19, 2010, WCPO filed a minor change application for a construction permit for their new allotment. The FCC granted the construction permit on July 9. At 2:05 a.m. on December 8, 2010, WCPO performed a flash-cut, turning off channel 10 and starting digital operations on channel 22. This flash-cut also included a power boost to 910 kW.

References

External links

WCPO, Ch. 9 (from Scripps)

ABC network affiliates
Court TV affiliates
Laff (TV network) affiliates
Ion Mystery affiliates
Scripps News affiliates
E. W. Scripps Company television stations
Television channels and stations established in 1949
CPO-TV
1949 establishments in Ohio